Hilda Katz (1909–1997) was an American artist. Her work is included in the collections of the Smithsonian American Art Museum, the Metropolitan Museum of Art and the Brooklyn Museum.

References

1909 births
1997 deaths
Artists from New York City
20th-century American women artists